Nicrophorus pliozaenicus is an extinct species of burying beetle described by Erasmus Gersdorf in 1969.

References

Silphidae
Beetles of North America

Fossil taxa described in 1969